Anne Bloom (born Anne Pearson on April 18, 1947) is an American former film and television actress.

Biography

Bloom's television acting career, which spans three decades, began with an appearance on ABC's medical drama Marcus Welby, M.D. in 1974. She also had a brief film career including the part of Peter Billingsley's mother in 1985's The Dirt Bike Kid, though she is probably best known for her television career, especially for her role as television news correspondent Frosty Kimelman on HBO's Not Necessarily the News. for which she was four times nominated for Cable Ace Award for Best Actress in a Comedy Series.
She also appeared as Parker Lewis' mother Judy for the first season of the Fox sitcom Parker Lewis Can't Lose, being replaced in subsequent seasons by Mary Ellen Trainor. She was a regular on The $25,000 Pyramid for five years and a hostess of Totally Hidden Video.

Today, Bloom is a licensed marriage and family therapist in Beverly Hills, California.

Filmography
 Loving Couples (1980) as Nurse
 The Dirt Bike Kid (1985) as Janet Simmons
 Talking Walls (1987)
 That's Adequate (1989) as Maid Marian
 False Identity (1990) as Elsie

TV series
 Marcus Welby, M.D. (1974) (episode "The 266 Days") as Susan
 Cage Without a Key (1975) (TV Movie) as Joleen
 The Rookies (1975) (episode "Measure of Mercy") as Midge Warren
 Everyday (1978) (unknown episodes)
 The Amazing Spider-Man (1978) (episode "The Deadly Dust: Part I") as Carla Wilson
 Turnabout (1979) (episode "Till Dad Do Us Part") as Valerie
 The Misadventures of Sheriff Lobo (1981) (episode "Macho Man") as Photographer Jackie
 Magnum, P.I. (1981) (episode "All Roads Lead To Floyd") as Cindy Lewellyn
 The Greatest American Hero (1982) (episode "The Devil and the Deep Blue Sea") as Linda Harrison
 I, Desire (1982) as Marge Bookman
 All-Star Blitz (1985) (episode dated October 24, 1985) as herself
 Airwolf (1986) (episode "Discovery") as Alma Grace Harrison
 Celebrity Double Talk (1986) (5 episodes) as herself
 Night Court (1988) (episode "Danny Got His Gun: Part I") as Wanda Chaney
 ABC Weekend Specials (1988) (episode "Runaway Ralph") as Garf's Mother
 Blackout (1988) (5 episodes) as herself
 The New Hollywood Squares (1988) (episode date April 18, 1988) as herself
 Doogie Howser, M.D. (1989) (episode "She Ain't Heavy, She's My Cousin") as Ruth Favor
 Not Necessarily the News (1982–1990) (60 episodes) as Frosty Kimelman
 The (New) $25,000 Pyramid (1986–1991) (30 episodes) as herself
 Totally Hidden Video (1990–1991) (unknown episodes) as Hostess
 Parker Lewis Can't Lose (1990–1991) (10 episodes) as Judy Lewis
 On the Air (1992) (TV mini-series) (episode # 1.3) as Sylvia Hudson
 Duckman: Private Dick/Family Man (1996) (episode "Sperms of Endearment") (voice)
 Johnny Bravo (1997) (episode "Substitute Teacher/A Wolf in Chick's Clothing/Intensive Care") as Fluffy/woman (voice)
 The Angry Beavers (1997) (episode "House Broken/Stinky Toe") as Tina/Older Woman (voice)
 The History of Coolness: A Look Back at 'Parker Lewis Can't Lose''' (2009) (video documentary short) as herself

Awards and nominations
 Cable Ace Award Actress in a Comedy Series for Not Necessarily the News'' 4 Nominations (1983, 1984, 1985, 1987)

References

External links

American television actresses
American voice actresses
1947 births
People from Los Angeles
People from Beverly Hills, California
People from West Hollywood, California
Living people
21st-century American women